Spaulding-Sidway Boathouse is a historic boathouse located on Grand Island in Erie County, New York.  The boathouse was built as part of the "River Lawn" estate of Elbridge G. Spaulding (1809–1897).

History
The Spaulding-Sidway Boathouse is a Late Victorian Stick / Queen Anne style frame structure constructed in 1870.  The boathouse is a two-story frame structure, clad in clapboard, on concrete piers.

Between 1935 and 1940, to save the boathouse from demolition when the Spaulding estate was acquired in order to become Beaver Island State Park, neighboring property owner Frank St. John Sidway, a grandson of Spaulding, moved it about 270 feet northwest to his land.  In about 1990, steel framing was added to shore up the original wood framework.

Significance
The building is a rare surviving example of a small boathouse used primarily for storage and social activities and is reflective of Grand Island's importance as a seasonal recreational area in the 1800s.  The boathouse has been continuously used for light boat storage and social activities since it was built, and although many boathouses on Grand Island have fallen victim to weather, it stands today virtually as built and is now a part of a private residence.  It was listed on the National Register of Historic Places in 1998.

See also
Elbridge G. Spaulding
Frank St. John Sidway

References

External links
Spaulding-Sidway Boathouse, Buffalo as an Architectural Museum
Spaulding-Sidway Boathouse - U.S. National Register of Historic Places on Waymarking.com
Historic Preservation on Grand Island

Boathouses in the United States
Transportation buildings and structures on the National Register of Historic Places in New York (state)
Queen Anne architecture in New York (state)
Infrastructure completed in 1870
Transportation buildings and structures in Erie County, New York
National Register of Historic Places in Erie County, New York
Boathouses on the National Register of Historic Places